The 2014 Americas Rugby Championship season was the fifth season of the Americas Rugby Championship. It took place between 11 and 19 October 2014 in Langford, British Columbia. The tournament featured the same teams as in the 2013 version: Argentina Jaguars, Canada Selects, USA Selects, and Uruguay. The Argentina Jaguars won the tournament for a fifth straight time, once again going undefeated in three matches.

Teams

 
 
  USA Selects

Standings

Schedule

All times are in PDT (UTC−7).

References

External links
 Official Website

2014
International rugby union competitions hosted by Canada
2014 rugby union tournaments for national teams
2014 in Canadian rugby union
2014 in American rugby union
2014 in Argentine rugby union
rugby union
2014 in North American rugby union
2014 in South American rugby union
October 2014 sports events in Canada